Bianca Maria Kajlich (born March 26, 1977) is an American actress. Kajlich has had starring and supporting roles in television and film including the role of Jennifer on the CBS comedy Rules of Engagement (2007–2013). Kajlich was an actress on Bosch as Christina Henry during Season 5 of the Amazon Prime series.

Early life
Kajlich was born in Seattle, Washington, the daughter of Patti (née Campana) and Dr. Aurel Jan "Relo" Kajlich. Her father was Slovak and her mother is of Italian descent. She is a graduate of Bishop Blanchet High School in Seattle, Washington, and attended Washington State University in Pullman, Washington.

Career
Kajlich began her career with the Olympic Ballet Theater as a ballet dancer in Edmonds, Washington. After seven years, she decided to try acting. By that time, she had already performed lead roles in The River, Swan Lake, and The Nutcracker. Kajlich's first acting part was in an advertisement for Kragen Auto Parts. She has since appeared in the films Bring It On, 10 Things I Hate About You, Halloween: Resurrection, and 30 Minutes Or Less. Kajlich also had recurring roles in the television series Boston Public as Lisa Grier and in Dawson's Creek as Natasha Kelly, as well as  roles in UPN's Rock Me Baby and the Fox drama Vanished.

Kajlich appeared in an episode of the USA Network's Psych entitled "Psy vs. Psy" as a psychic FBI agent who ends up not being who she appears to be.  She appeared as a major character in an episode of Fox's short-lived action TV show, Fastlane, as a prostitute named Bree whose pimp wants her dead. Kajlich had a quick appearance as a punk nose-piercing girl in an episode of Freaks and Geeks, and she played Jennifer on the CBS comedy Rules of Engagement. She was ranked No. 74 on the Maxim "Hot 100 Women of 2004" and No. 63 on the Maxim "Hot 100 Women of 2007".

In March 2013, Kajlich was cast as a main character in the NBC sitcom Undateable, which premiered on May 29, 2014 and ended January 29, 2016.

In October 2017, she appeared as Paula, a prostitute befriended with sartorial advice by Larry David in HBO's Curb Your Enthusiasm.

She starred in the Amazon Prime series Bosch as Christina Henry, which completed on June 25, 2021 with its seventh and final season.

Personal life
Kajlich married soccer player Landon Donovan on December 31, 2006. The couple separated in late 2009 and Donovan filed for divorce on December 23, 2010. On December 16, 2012, she married radio personality Michael Catherwood. Kajlich gave birth to the couple's first child, Magnolia, in April 2014.

Filmography

References

External links
 
 Rules of Engagement Cast Bio – Bianca Kajlich
 Donovan Files for Divorce from Bianca Kajlich.
 Bianca Kajlich on Twitter

1977 births
American film actresses
American people of Italian descent
American people of Slovak descent
American television actresses
Living people
Actresses from Seattle
Washington State University alumni
20th-century American actresses
21st-century American actresses
Bishop Blanchet High School alumni